Seebarn Cricket Ground is a cricket ground in Seebarn, Austria. It was opened in 1995 as the first dedicated Cricket Ground in Austria. In 2000 a permanent sight screen was added to the ground and in 2001 a pavilion.

The ground is the home base of Austria's national cricket team as well as the Vienna Cricket Club and has hosted a number of international tournaments.

Between 2001 and 2004 there was a second ground adjacent to the remaining ground.

References

External links
Seebarn Cricket Ground at ESPNcricinfo

Cricket grounds in Austria
Sports venues completed in 1995
1995 establishments in Austria
20th-century architecture in Austria